Albert R. Spencer was an English footballer who played for Port Vale, Wolverhampton Wanderers, and Willenhall in the 1920s.

Career
Spencer joined Port Vale as an amateur in October 1922. After making his debut on New Year's Day 1923, in a 3–1 defeat at South Shields, he signed professional forms the next month. He played just another two Second Division games in the 1922–23 season, before he was transferred to Wolverhampton Wanderers in June 1923. He then returned to Vale five months later. His second spell at The Old Recreation Ground was just as uneventful and he was released after playing just one game in the 1923–24 season. He moved on to Willenhall.

Career statistics
Source:

References

Year of birth missing
Year of death missing
English footballers
Association football forwards
Port Vale F.C. players
Wolverhampton Wanderers F.C. players
Willenhall F.C. players
English Football League players